The Gateway is a large, open-air retail, residential, and office complex in Salt Lake City, Utah, United States. It is centered on the historic Union Pacific Depot on the west side of Downtown Salt Lake City between 50 North and 200 South streets and between 400 and 500 West streets. Rio Grande Street has been the site of many special events and becomes a one-way street and heads north through the center. The center has featured as many as 89 outlets, but recent changes have allowed the center to provide new retail shopping experiences and become more of a social gathering place centered on dining and nightlife.

In the northeast corner, a seven-story  office tower for more than 1,200 employees was completed in 2007 for the sole occupancy of Fidelity Investments.

By 2014, the center's occupancy rate had fallen, with major tenants such as Apple Inc. having moved half a mile east to the newer and more centrally-located City Creek Center, opened in 2012 by the Church of Jesus Christ of Latter-day Saints.

Retail Properties of America Inc. had valued the center to $75 million in 2014 and would expect further decline. Previous efforts to stabilize and sell the center had failed. Some of the outdoor areas had been upgraded, and nearby development projects had been planned.

In 2016, The Gateway was sold to a commercial real estate company named "Vestar". The company was planning to renovate the center for $30 million. Instead, $100 million was invested by Vestar since late 2018. Vestar restored the area's popularity and increased security, lowering crime by 79% and expecting crime to lower even further. The downtown shelter located on Rio Grande Street has also seen improvement because of the mall's new management.

References

External links

 
 Clark Planetarium
 Discovery Gateway
 The Depot
 Wiseguys Comedy

2001 establishments in Utah
Buildings and structures in Salt Lake City
Gateway
Shopping malls established in 2001
Shopping malls in Utah
Tourist attractions in Salt Lake City